The Queen's Gambit: Music from the Netflix Limited Series is the soundtrack album to the period drama miniseries The Queen's Gambit, based on the 1983 novel of the same name by Walter Tevis. The original score composed by Carlos Rafael Rivera, known for his previous collaborations with the showrunner Scott Frank in A Walk Among the Tombstones (2014), and the miniseries Godless (2017). Following production on the latter, Frank pitched the one-liner from the source material for its television adaptation, in April 2018 and agreed to work on the musical score, with scoring began in August 2018. The series consisted of orchestral music, to focus on the "instrumental depth and color" for each episodes, progressing on Beth Harmon's life.

The score album was released on October 23, 2020 through Maisie Music Publishing label, coinciding with the release on Netflix. In addition to the 38-track score, an original song entitled "I Can't Remember Love" was composed for the series, performed by Anna Hauss and written by Robert Wienröder and William Horberg, the series' executive producer. The track was released as a single on November 11, 2020, and the music video was released later in August 2021. While the soundtrack was not released in physical formats, Mondo released a two-disc vinyl set, consisting two editions of the package, unveiled on October 22, 2021.

The score was positively received with praise towards Rivera's composition. He would later won the Outstanding Music Composition for a Limited or Anthology Series, Movie, or Special at the 73rd Primetime Creative Arts Emmy Awards, in addition to two other nominations at the same ceremony. At the 64th Annual Grammy Awards, Rivera's score shared the Best Score Soundtrack for Visual Media award with Trent Reznor, Atticus Ross and Jon Batiste's score for Soul.

Background 
Carlos Rafael Rivera worked for three years to score the series. He was first involved in the project in April 2018, when Scott Frank, the show-runner of the series, whom Rivera worked in A Walk Among the Tombstones (2014). By then, he progressed for a research work, the following month and began scoring that August 2018. According to Frank, in an interview to Variety magazine, he felt that Rivera's music was crucial as "the chess sequences had to somehow feel emotional, even if one wasn't familiar with the game. The score also did a lot of heavy lifting when it came to the interior of Beth Harmon. While the camera was often very close, Carlos’ music somehow conveyed this inner ruin when she was at the bottom, or this soaring release when she found connection or happiness. I can't imagine the show working as well as it did without that score."

Frank initially wanted the score to be piano-based only, but later decided to go on with a classical and orchestral score, to add more "instrumental depth and color". Speaking to Variety, Rivera explained that "The piano was very present in the first episode. By the time she moves out of that world of grays and browns, it becomes a more colorful world, so we had to add instrumentation. It started to hit me: What if her reality in the orphanage is all piano, but when she looks up and plays the games on the ceiling, it's fully orchestral, like a dream?"

Rivera split the main theme for the character Beth Harmon, as "the whole story is told from Beth's point of view. It's a single character point of view story. We only see what she sees, and what that generates is a very complex character." He felt like a single theme for her as a character is "very constraining in a way, and put her in one color" and further added that, "the idea was to create music that would support her. For her addiction, it fills her and the theme fills her around. There was a musical theme for that. There was a musical theme for when she wins, or if she's up to something, if she was feeling cool, or if she makes a really interesting move in the game. I tried to use little motifs that would help generate material to be able to dress up the story as much as possible." According to Rivera, scoring for chess sequences was like "scoring 20 games differently". He further explained "It was scoring her emotional state. The games were contextual. If she was going to battle it out with Benny [one of her mentors], then there was going to be battle music."

The main title theme was wrote within December 2018. Rivera described that "it is not only the two people playing against each other, it's each individual playing against time. That clock is ever-present in the games. I had to let go of being at ‘quarter note equals 60’ or the tempo of an actual clock. At some point, the music just has to service the story." Discussing with Wiley Stateman, was the sound designer of the series, Rivera described about the clock-ticking sound balancing with the music, but also skeptic about the sound as "it may feel annoying to some people as the clock has its own tempo and then the music has another tempo". Rivera avoided percussive instruments to write the main theme, because he felt that "the clock is a percussion instrument in its own way. It was complicated to weave around without it becoming insanity-inducing." He also scored a theme for Beth's biological mother, and also Rivera added that through the music, he wanted to show Beth's pain, adding:"Beth didn't know how to love in those first eight years of her life — her father was absent and her mother was unstable — and she doesn't understand that part of life. She does, however, understand chess, because she feels like she can control it. There was an empathy machine trigger that wasn't activated in the first stage of her life, to no fault of her own; the music for these flashbacks are a variation that is darker and lower. There was this melodic idea that was actually slowed down and you'd hear it in the cello, to resonate that stoned point-of-view."

Reception
The soundtrack was critically acclaimed, with music critic Jonathan Broxton, calling it as "his best to date". He further compared his music to James Horner's Searching for Bobby Fischer (1993), James Newton Howard's Pawn Sacrifice (2014), and Alexandre Desplat's The Luzhin Defense (2000). Paste's  Allison Keene called the score as "exceptional" as the show.

Awards and nominations

Track listing

Songs featured in the series:

 "Finale/Hallelujah" – Alfred Newman and Mike McDonald
 "You're the One" – The Vogues
 "Comin' Home Baby" – Quincy Jones
 "Somewhere I Belong" – Gabor Szabo
 "Bert's Blues" – Donovan
 "Along Comes Mary" – The Association
 "The Gift" – Storefront Church
 "Fever" – Peggy Lee
 "Bye-ya" – Thelonius Monk
 "Classical Gas" – Mason Williams
 "(I'm Not Your) Steppin' Stone" – The Monkees
 "Teach Me Tonight" – Nancy Wilson and Ron McMaster
 "Stop Your Sobbing" – The Kinks
 "Pink Champagne" – Georgie Fame and the Blue Fames
 "Yeh, Yeh" – Georgie Fame and the Blue Fames
 "Tut tut tut tut" – Gillian Hills
 "Venus" – Shocking Blue
 "Jimmy Mack" – Laura Nyro and LaBelle
 "Ave Maris Stella" – Our Lady of Perpetual Help Chant Choir
 "String Quartet No. 3 in F Major, Op. 73: IV Adagio" – Dmitri Shostakovich and Eder Quartet

Charts

Personnel 
Credits adapted from Allmusic

 Carlos Rafael Rivera – composer, producer
 Asuka Ito, David Randal Stal – additional music
 Joy Adams – cello 
 Shea Kole – cello 
 Siobhan Cronin – violin 
 The Budapest Art Orchestra – orchestra
 Miklos Lukacs – orchestra conductor
 Jeremy Levy – orchestration
 Gill Humphrey, Tim Ryan – additional orchestration
 Tom Kramer – music editor
 Gabor Buczko – recording engineer
 Dávid Lukács – pro-tools engineer
 Lawrence Manchester – mixing
 Pejtsik Péter – music conductor
 Tori Fillat – music contractor
 Eric Hoehne – music consultant
 Mark Cally – music preparation
 Alan Hynes – packaging, design and art direction

Notes

References

2020 soundtrack albums
Grammy Award for Best Score Soundtrack for Visual Media
Classical albums